Martin L. Pall is professor emeritus of biochemistry and basic medical sciences at Washington State University. He is a specialist in Chronic Fatigue Syndrome, multiple chemical sensitivity, and the effects of low-intensity microwave frequency electromagnetic fields (MWV-EMF) on the human body. He believes that the expansion of 5G mobile phone networks and the use of wireless technology has negative consequences for human health.

Early life
Pall has a BA in physics and earned his PhD in biochemistry and genetics from Caltech.

Career
Pall was professor of biochemistry and basic medical sciences at Washington State University (WSU). During his tenure, he researched and published numerous articles on Chronic Fatigue Syndrome. In 2008, he retired from his teaching position to concentrate his time researching the effect multiple chemical sensitivity and low intensity microwave frequency electromagnetic fields (MWV-EMF) have on the human body.

He has been a critic of the expansion of 5G mobile phone networks and the use of wireless technology generally, believing the technology has negative consequences for human health. In 2019, Kenneth R. Foster of Scientific American described him as "the most visible scientist in the public arena on this issue", while The Guardian described his research interests as "practically an encyclopaedia of the medical counterculture".

Professor Kenneth Foster, a bioengineer at the University of Pennsylvania has criticised Pall's ideas as using selective evidence that ignores research that finds no link between mobile phone technology and human health.

Selected publications

Articles
 "Wi-Fi is an important threat to human health", Environmental Research, Vol. 164, July 2018, pp. 405–416. https://doi.org/10.1016/j.envres.2018.01.035. This is an example of his work that received a comment due to its low scientific quality: "Comments on "Wi-Fi is an important threat to human health"", Environmental Research, Vol. 168, January 2019, pp.514-515. https://doi.org/10.1016/j.envres.2018.07.026.

Books
 Explaining Unexplained Illnesses: Disease Paradigm for Chronic Fatigue Syndrome, Multiple Chemical Sensitivity, Fibromyalgia, Post-traumatic Stress &c. (2007)

References

External links 
 Martin Pall´s profile on ResearchGate

American biochemists
Living people
Year of birth missing (living people)
Washington State University faculty
California Institute of Technology alumni
Johns Hopkins University alumni